Tsiklitiras Pylos F.C. is a Greek football club, based in Pylos, Messenia. The club took its name from Konstantinos Tsiklitiras, a Greek athlete and Olympic Champion of the former century.

Honors

Domestic Titles and honors
 Messinia FCA  Champions: 1
 2015-16
 Messinia FCA  Cup Winners: 2
 2014-15, 2015–16

References

 
Gamma Ethniki clubs
Sport in Messenia
Association football clubs established in 1968
1968 establishments in Greece